The 1914 Cincinnati Reds season was a season in American baseball. It consisted of the Cincinnati Reds attempting to win the National League, but finishing in 8th place and last in the league.

Offseason 
After the 1913 season, Reds owner Garry Herrmann, unhappy with the poor performance of the club, challenged his manager Joe Tinker on his managerial style and sought his resignation.  Eventually, Herrmann and Tinker conferred, and in October, Tinker signed a contract to manage the team in 1914.  Herrmann then fired Tinker in November, as Tinker complained that Herrmann did not seek his input on player transactions, while Herrmann charged the Tinker did not accept his authority.

On December 12, the Reds acquired Buck Herzog and Grover Hartley from the New York Giants in exchange for Bob Bescher.  Herzog, a shortstop, hit .286 with three home runs and 31 RBI in 96 games in 1913, while Hartley saw limited time as a backup catcher with the Giants in 1913, batting .316 in 23 games.  The Reds then named Herzog as player-manager of the club, as this would be his first managerial job.

With the Federal League beginning play in the 1914 season, a number of Reds players jumped to the new league.  Notable players that left Cincinnati were Dave Davenport, Mordecai Brown, Harry Chapman, and Armando Marsans to the St. Louis Terriers, Chief Johnson to the Kansas City Packers and George Suggs to the Baltimore Terrapins.

Regular season 
Dick Hoblitzell, the Reds starting first baseman since 1909, struggled badly in the 1914 season, and was eventually placed on waivers, as the Boston Red Sox picked him up on July 16.  Hoblitzell was hitting only .210 with no home runs and 26 RBI in 78 games, well below his career numbers.

Offensively, the Reds struggled during the 1914 season, batting only .236, seventh in the National League.  The club had a league low 142 doubles and 16 home runs.  Heinie Groh led the team with a .288 batting average, and had two home runs and 32 RBI in 139 games.  Player-manager Buck Herzog batted .281 with one home run and 40 RBI with a team high 46 stolen bases in 138 games in his first season in Cincinnati.  Bert Niehoff led the Reds with four home runs and 49 RBI, while batting .242.

The pitching staff was led by Red Ames, who had a 15-21 record with a 2.64 ERA in 47 games.  He pitched a team high 297 innings and had 128 strikeouts and 18 complete games.  Rube Benton led the club in wins, as he had a 16-18 record with a 2.96 ERA in 41 games.  Phil Douglas, in his first full season as a starting pitcher, had a team best 2.56 ERA in 45 games, starting 25 of them.  Douglas had a record of 11-18 and pitched 239.1 innings.

Season Summary 
Cincinnati was an early season surprise, as many expected the club to struggle after losing some top players to the Federal League, and by losing player-manager Joe Tinker.  An early season six game winning streak lifted the Reds to a 16-11 record, which put them in second place in the National League, only one game behind the Pittsburgh Pirates.  The Reds continued to play excellent baseball, and on June 1, after winning their eighth straight game, the Reds were tied with the New York Giants for first place in the league with a 26-15 record.  The club would then struggle badly, going 14-33 in their next 47 games to fall out of the pennant race.

The Reds continued to struggle, and won only six of their last 40 games, to close the season with a 60-94 record, last place in the National League and 34.5 games behind the first place Boston Braves.  The 60 wins and .390 winning percentage was the lowest by the club since the 1901 season.  The total attendance of 100,791 was the lowest total since the 1891 season.

Season standings

Record vs. opponents

Notable transactions 
 April 20, 1914: Chief Johnson jumped from the Reds to the Kansas City Packers.

Roster

Player stats

Batting

Starters by position 
Note: Pos = Position; G = Games played; AB = At bats; H = Hits; Avg. = Batting average; HR = Home runs; RBI = Runs batted in

Other batters 
Note: G = Games played; AB = At bats; H = Hits; Avg. = Batting average; HR = Home runs; RBI = Runs batted in

Pitching

Starting pitchers 
Note: G = Games pitched; IP = Innings pitched; W = Wins; L = Losses; ERA = Earned run average; SO = Strikeouts

Other pitchers 
Note: G = Games pitched; IP = Innings pitched; W = Wins; L = Losses; ERA = Earned run average; SO = Strikeouts

Relief pitchers 
Note: G = Games pitched; W = Wins; L = Losses; SV = Saves; ERA = Earned run average; SO = Strikeouts

Notes

References 
1914 Cincinnati Reds season at Baseball Reference

Cincinnati Reds seasons
Cincinnati Reds season
Cincinnati Reds